Ploshchad Alexandra Nevskogo II is a station on the Line 4 of Saint Petersburg Metro, opened on December 30, 1985.

Gallery

External links

Saint Petersburg Metro stations
Railway stations in Russia opened in 1985
1985 establishments in the Soviet Union
Railway stations located underground in Russia